The Plagues of Breslau is a 2018 Polish crime thriller directed by Patryk Vega. It premiered on 24 November 2018.

The title corresponds to the former name of Wrocław, which from 1741 until 1945 was "Breslau". The film and plot were loosely based on a series of crime novels by Marek Krajewski, who often incorporates Breslau's pre-war crime scene into his works.

Plot 
Set in the city of Wroclaw, detective Helena Rus finds a corpse sewn in a cowhide. The murders continue for the next five days and each victim is killed at precisely 18:00 (6 p.m.). The Polish police along with Helena Rus attempt to find and capture the serial killer before he strikes again.

Cast 
 Małgorzata Kożuchowska as Helena Ruś
 Daria Widawska as Magda Drewniak / Iwona Bogacka
 Tomasz Oświeciński as Jarek "Bronson"
 Katarzyna Bujakiewicz as Nastka, Bronson's wife
 Andrzej Grabowski as public prosecutor
 Iwona Bielska as a pathomorphologist

References

External links

2010s serial killer films
2018 films
Polish crime films
Polish-language Netflix original films